Ricken is both a surname and a given name. Notable people with the name include:

Adalbert Ricken (1851–1921), German mycologist
David L. Ricken (born 1952), American Roman Catholic bishop
Lars Ricken (born 1976), German footballer
 Ricken Patel (born 1977), Canadian/British businessman

See also
Ricken Pass, a Swiss mountain pass
Ricken Tunnel, a railway tunnel under the Ricken Pass

Masculine given names
Surnames from given names